Ahmed Al-Jahawi is a Saudi Arabian football player.

International career
On 13 February 2002, Al-Jahawi made his debut for Saudi Arabia in a home game at King Fahd International Stadium against Denmark in which Saudi Arabia lost from a goal from Ebbe Sand in the 16th minute to make the score 1-0.

External links
 
 
 

1979 births
Living people
Saudi Arabian footballers
Saudi Arabia international footballers
Al Nassr FC players
Al-Faisaly FC players
Najran SC players
Al-Watani Club players
Al-Shoulla FC players
Al-Diriyah Club players
Al-Arabi SC (Saudi Arabia) players
Al-Washm Club players
Al-Waseel FC players
Saudi First Division League players
Saudi Professional League players
Saudi Second Division players
Saudi Fourth Division players
Association football defenders